New Man Numan: The Best of Gary Numan is a compilation album released on the T.V. Records label in 1982 of songs featuring Gary Numan. The album reached number 45 on the UK Albums Chart.

Track listing

Side 1 
 "Are 'Friends' Electric?" by Tubeway Army
 "Cars" by Gary Numan
 "We Are Glass" by Gary Numan
 "Complex" by Gary Numan
 "Me, I Disconnect From You" by Tubeway Army
 "Down In The Park" by Tubeway Army
 "I Die: You Die" by Gary Numan

Side 2 
 "She's Got Claws" by Gary Numan
 "Love Needs No Disguise" by Dramatis, vocals Gary Numan
 "This Wreckage" by Gary Numan
 "Stormtrooper in Drag" by Paul Gardiner featuring Gary Numan
 "We Take Mystery (To Bed)" by Gary Numan
 "Music for Chameleons" by Gary Numan
 "White Boys And Heroes" by Gary Numan

All songs written by Gary Numan except "Love Needs No Disguise" (Cedric Sharpley, Chris Payne, Denis Haines, Rrussell Bell) and "Stormtrooper In Drag" (Paul Gardiner)

All songs produced by Gary Numan except "Love Needs No Disguise" (Dramatis, Simon Heyworth)

References 

1982 greatest hits albums
Gary Numan compilation albums